Falling Rock is an unincorporated community in Kanawha County, West Virginia, United States. Falling Rock has a post office with ZIP code 25079.

The community takes its name from nearby Falling Rock Creek.

References

Unincorporated communities in Kanawha County, West Virginia
Unincorporated communities in West Virginia